
Across a Crowded Room is the fourth solo album by Richard Thompson released in 1985, on both vinyl and CD. As of 2019, it remains his final collaboration with long-time producer Joe Boyd (who had produced Thompson's previous four albums, including Shoot Out the Lights), as well as his last studio album to have been fully recorded in England. The album gives its name to the film Richard Thompson: Across a Crowded Room, a concert film shot at a 1985 performance at Barrymore's in Ottawa, Ontario, Canada, which focuses on material from the album.

Track listing
All songs written by Richard Thompson.

"When the Spell Is Broken" – 4:31
"You Don't Say" – 3:35
"I Ain't Going to Drag My Feet No More" – 4:22
"Love in a Faithless Country" – 5:55
"Fire in the Engine Room" – 3:39
"Walking Through a Wasted Land" – 4:01
"Little Blue Number" – 3:04
"She Twists the Knife Again" – 3:12
"Ghosts in the Wind" – 5:39

The listing reflects the sequence of songs the original LP release. The original CD issue included an extra track, "Shine On Love" and has a different running order. Subsequent CD re-issues have reflected the song selection and sequence shown above. In 1985 the album was re-issued on CD by PolyGram and in 1992 was re-mastered at Sound Recording Technology, Cambridge and re-issued on CD by BGO.

Personnel 

Source:

Musicians 
 Richard Thompson – guitar, vocals
 Simon Nicol – guitar
 Dave Mattacks – drums
 Bruce Lynch – bass guitar
  – alto saxophone
 Pete Thomas – tenor saxophone
 Christine Collister, Phil Barnes, Clive Gregson  and The Soultanas – backing vocals
 Alan Dunn – accordion
 Philip Pickett – shawm, crumhorn, recorder and symphony.

Technical 
 Joe Boyd – production
 Jack Nuber – engineering
 Greg Jackman and Jerry Boys – remix engineering
 Chris Dickie – assistant engineering
 Jack Skinner – mastering
 Dennis Keely – back cover photography
 Phil Smee and Donato Cinicolo – front cover photography
 Phil Smee at Waldo's – cover design

References

External 
 

1985 albums
Richard Thompson (musician) albums
Albums produced by Joe Boyd
Polydor Records albums